Mukeshkumar Rasikbhai Shah (born 16 May 1958) is a judge of Supreme Court of India. He is former chief justice of Patna High Court. He is also former judge of Gujarat High Court.

Career 
Shah was born on 16 May 1958. He was enrolled as an Advocate on 19 July 1982 and practiced in the Gujarat High Court and Central Administrative Tribunal in Civil, Criminal, Constitutional, Taxation, Labour, Service and Company matters and specialized in land, constitutional, Education, Excise, Custom matters. He was appointed as an additional judge of the Gujarat High Court on 7 March 2004 and appointed as permanent judge on 22 June 2005. He was appointed as chief justice of Patna High Court on 12 August 2018. He was appointed as judge of Supreme Court of India on 2 November 2018.

References

1958 births
Living people
21st-century Indian judges
Chief Justices of the Patna High Court
Judges of the Gujarat High Court
Justices of the Supreme Court of India